The Roland JV-2080 is a rack-mount expandable MIDI sound module, and an improved version of the Roland JV-1080. Produced by the Roland Corporation, released in 1996 and built on a sample-based synthesis architecture, the JV-2080 provides a library of on-board sample material and a semi-modular synthesis engine.

Main features
The JV-2080 ("2080") is a sample + synthesis synthesizer with support for 768 internal patches, including General MIDI. In addition to the synthesizer, it also includes a multi effects module, with 40 effect types, of which three can be used simultaneously. The 2080 is expandable via proprietary modules that contain both sample-based waveform data and patch information.
The internal memory of the 2080 is divided into five sections.
 USER – User re-writeable storage (RAM), initially contains a modified copy of PR-E.
 PR-A, B, C, E (Preset A through C and E) – Presets in read-only memory, cannot be modified.
 PR-D (General MIDI) – Presets compatible with the General MIDI system.
 XP-A through H (Expansion A through H) – Patches and Rhythm Sets from expansion boards, installed in slots A through H.
 CARD – Data from compatible memory cards and sound library cards (PN-JV80 series).

The JV-2080 can also be 'stacked' with up to eight units ganged together to increase polyphony to achieve a 512 voice multitimbral performance.

On-board demos
The JV-2080 has three on-board demo songs.
The demos are:
 "Timepeace", by Scott Tibbs.
 "Denki", by Ryeland Allison.
 "Short Cuts", by Yuuki Kato.  Directed by Takayuki Nagatani.

Factory sounds
The core sampled waveforms of the JV-2080 were developed by Roland R&D-LA in Culver City, California.
Some of the factory presets and expansion board sounds were created by Eric Persing of Spectrasonics and Ace Yukawa.

Expansion
In common with other Roland instruments, the JV-2080 could be expanded with SR-JV80 expansion boards, and could accept up to eight of them at a time.

Expansion cards

 SR-JV80-01: Pop
 SR-JV80-02: Orchestral
 SR-JV80-03: Piano
 SR-JV80-04: Vintage Synth
 SR-JV80-05: World
 SR-JV80-06: Dance* 
 SR-JV80-07: Super Sound Set
 SR-JV80-08: Keyboards of the 60s & 70s
 SR-JV80-09: Session
 SR-JV80-10: Bass and Drums
 SR-JV80-11: Techno
 SR-JV80-12: Hip-Hop
 SR-JV80-13: Vocal
 SR-JV80-14: Asia
 SR-JV80-15: Special FX
 SR-JV80-16: Orchestral II
 SR-JV80-17: Country
 SR-JV80-18: Latin World
 SR-JV80-19: House
 SR-JV80-97: Experience III
 SR-JV80-98: Experience II
 SR-JV80-99: Experience

Notice: Due to copyright problems Roland no longer distributes the Dance expansion board.

Notable users and genres
The JV-1080 and JV-2080 attract artists and producers from a broad range of genres. In 2001, synthpop artist Thomas Dolby once remarked that he didn't find the JV as immediate in usability as his older synthesizers.  The JV-2080 has featured in the studios of  Tidy Trax Records, a Hard House record label based in the UK.  Australian Electro band  Gerling  used the JV-1080 on their album Children Of Telepathic Experiences. LTJ Bukem and Photek have also used it in music production and film scoring, respectively. Other users include Midge Ure, Gary Barlow, Armin van Buuren, Glen Ballard, Jimmy Douglass, London Elektricity, 1 Giant Leap, David Frank, and Máni Svavarsson.

References

Further reading

External links
 Polynominal JV-2080 page| technical review, manual and audio clips demo

JV-2080